Acronychia acronychioides, commonly known as white aspen, is a species of small to medium-sized rainforest tree that is endemic to north-eastern Queensland. It has trifoliate leaves with elliptic to egg-shaped leaves on stems that are more or less cylindrical, creamy yellow flowers in large groups in leaf axils and fleshy, pear-shaped or spherical fruit.

Description

Taxonomy
White aspen was first formally described in 1864 by Ferdinand von Mueller who gave it the name Euodia acronychioides and published the description in Fragmenta phytographiae Australiae. In 1974, Thomas Gordon Hartley changed the name to Acronychia acronychioides in the Journal of the Arnold Arboretum.

Distribution and habitat
This tree grows as an understorey tree in well-developed rainforest between the Kutini-Payamu (Iron Range) National Park in Cape York Peninsula to the Eungella Range in central eastern Queensland, at altitudes from sea level .

Conservation status
White aspen is classified as least concern under the Queensland Government Nature Conservation Act 1992.

References

acronychioides
Endemic flora of Queensland
Plants described in 1864
Taxa named by Ferdinand von Mueller
Taxa named by Thomas Gordon Hartley